Camp Henry is a U.S. military base in Daegu, South Korea. Camp Henry was named in 1960 after First Lieutenant Frederick F. Henry, who served with F Company, 38th Infantry Regiment, 2nd Infantry Division. Camp Henry is located in the Nam-gu District of Daegu City on 51 acres. It consists primarily of administrative buildings and community support facilities. The U.S. Army Garrison - Daegu, headquartered at Camp Henry in Daegu, manages the installation and provides base operations services for the people who live and or work at Camp Carroll.  Major tenant units on Camp Henry are the 19th Sustainment Command (Expeditionary) and the 403rd Army Field Support Brigade—Korea (Provisional).

History
Built by the Imperial Japanese Army in 1921, what became known as Camp Henry served as the headquarters for  Jirō Minami, Governor-General of Korea between 1936 and 1942, as well as Japanese forces stationed in the Daegu area. When Korea was liberated from Japan in 1945, the camp was taken over by the Republic of Korea Army. During the Korean War, the camp saw little action because of its location inside the northern edge of the Pusan Perimeter. After the Korean War, the camp was used by the United States. In May 1960, the camp was named after First Lieutenant Frederick Henry, a Korean War Medal of Honor recipient.

Occupants

The 19th Expeditionary Sustainment Command
The 19th Sustainment Command (Expeditionary), formerly known as the 19th Theater Support Command, is the Army's first Sustainment Command (Expeditionary) to transform. It provides logistical support to the various Camp Henry Daegu, Republic of Korea "ARMY STRONG" subordinate units assigned to the 8th United States Army located throughout the Republic of Korea. Its Headquarters and Headquarters Company is located at Camp Walker.

The 403rd Army Field Support Brigade—Korea
The 403rd Army Field Support Brigade—Korea (Provisional) was initially established in April 1986 as the Logistics Assistance Office – Far East. The command was officially organized as Army Materiel Command – Far East in July 1987. Its mission is to provide oversight of AMC activities in the Pacific Theater and serve as the Army Material Command focal point for logistics and readiness issues in support of United States Army Pacific Command, United States Army Japan, and the Eighth United States Army.
Headquarters, Headquarters Company, USAG-Daegu
III Marine Expeditionary Force
25th Transportation Battalion
Criminal Investigation Division
168th Multifunctional Medical Battalion
176th Finance Company
Republic of Korea Army Support Group

Facilities
Army Community Service/Army Emergency Relief/Family Advocacy
Criminal Investigation Division
Fit to Win Center
Headquarters, USAG-Daegu
Henry's Place
Visual Information Support Center
Navy Federal Credit Union
Training Aids, Device Simulators & Simulations
Camp Henry Theater
Headquarters, 19th Expeditionary Sustainment Command
Fire Station
Dining Facility
Housing Office
Victory Field

Former Commanders
Since March 1985, the following officers have served as commander of Headquarters, 20th Area Support Group, which held both the base operations and combat service support missions in Area IV; Headquarters, Area IV Support Activity, which assumed the base operations mission from the 20th Area Support Group on 5 August 2004 and finally the Headquarters, U.S. Army Garrison - Daegu when the Area IV Support Activity was redesignated on 28 March 2007.

20th Area Support Group
COL Herbert N. Meininger March 1985-July 1986
COL Gary A. Frenn July 1986 July-1988
COL Michael R. Devine July 1988-June 1990
COL Francis N. Pitaro June 1990-June 1992
COL Richard B. Gilmore June 1992-June 1994
COL Larry D. Leighton June 1994-March 1996
COL Philip M. Jones March 1996-July 1996
COL Redding Hobby 22 July 1996 – 22 July 1998
COL Clarence C. Newby 22 July 1998 – 12 July 2000
COL Russell A. Bucy 12 July 2000 – 10 July 2002
COL Ronald F. McDonald the 3rd  10 July 2002 – 8 July 2004

Area IV Support Activity
COL James M. Joyner 16 October 2003 – 8 July 2004
COL Donald J. Hendrix 5 August 2004 – 27 July 2006
COL John E. Dumoulin, Jr. 27 July 2006 – 28 March 2007

U.S. Army Garrison - Daegu
COL John E. Dumoulin, Jr. 28 March 2007 – 30 May 2007
COL Michael P Saulnier 30 May 2007 – 26 June 2009
COL Terry D. Hodges 26 June 2009-September 2010
COL Kathleen A. Gavel 10 November 2010 – 19 June 2013
COL Jim M. Bradford 19 June 2013 – 19 June 2015
COL Ted Stephens 19 June 2015 – 28 June 2017
COL Robert P. Mann, Jr.  28 June 2017 – Present

See also 
 List of United States Army installations in South Korea

References

External links

, Camp Walker (USAG Daegu) Facebook page
, official website of USAG Daegu

Buildings and structures in North Gyeongsang Province
Korean War air bases
Henry, Camp
Walker
1921 establishments in Korea
Military installations established in 1921